Dientzenhofer is the name of a family of German architects, who were among the leading builders in Bohemian and German Baroque.

Architects 
 Georg Dientzenhofer, a poor mountain peasant & wife Barbara (Thanner) had five sons and two grandsons who became famous architects.
 Georg Dientzenhofer (1643–1689), prominent German architect
 Wolfgang Dientzenhofer (1648–1706), prominent German architect
 Christoph Dientzenhofer (7 July 1655 – 10 June 1722), prominent architect of Bohemian Baroque
 Kilian Ignaz Dientzenhofer (1689–1751), prominent architect of Bohemian Baroque
 Leonhard Dientzenhofer (1660–1707; also: Johann Leonhard), prominent German architect (Banz Abbey) with brother Johann
 Johann Dientzenhofer (1663–1726), prominent German architect
 Justus Heinrich Dientzenhofer (1702–1744), prominent German architect

Gallery

Other Dientzenhofer 
 Wolfgang Dinzenhofer (1678-1747) from Plankenhäusel in Au near Aibling, did probably learn at another Wolfgang Dientzenhofer in Amberg, according to documents of the local Salesian monastery. Afterwards, he built several churches in Oberbayern, in Götting, Kirchdorf bei Nußdorf am Inn, Flintsbach etc.
 Christoph Dinzenhofer (1681-1722 in Prague) from Pfraundorf, was a cousin of the architect brothers, and also constructor
 In 1631, an Abraham Dintzenhofer is recorded in the "Preßburger Bücher des ehrsamen Handwerks der Maurer- und Steinmetzen", the records of the constructor guild in Bratislava

Literature 
 Milada Vilímková, Johannes Brucker: Dientzenhofer. Eine bayerische Baumeisterfamilie in der Barockzeit. Rosenheimer Verlagshaus, 1989, 
 Hans Zimmer: Die Dientzenhofer. Ein bayerisches Baumeistergeschlecht in der Zeit des Barock. Rosenheim 1976,

See also 
 5318 Dientzenhofer is one of the asteroids named after people

References 

Czech Baroque architects
German Baroque architects
Czech families
German families
Czech people of German descent
German Bohemian people
People from Upper Bavaria
Architects from Prague